Megan Hodge Easy (born October 15, 1988) is an American indoor volleyball player who won a silver medal at the 2012 Summer Olympics with the US team and played for Pennsylvania State University's volleyball team. Currently, she plays in Brazilian team Itambé-Minas.

Early life and high school
Hodge was born in St. Thomas, U.S. Virgin Islands. Her family moved to Durham, North Carolina when she was 3 years old. Her parents, Michael and Carmen, are both former members of the U.S. Virgin Islands National Volleyball Team. Her mother, Carmen played volleyball at George Washington University and her father played at the University of the Virgin Islands.

Hodge began playing volleyball at age 12, and when she started, she could not stop. She attended Riverside High School where she was one of the most dominant young players in the nation, as she posted a four-year total of 1,596 kills, 319 blocks, 647 digs, 286 aces and 130 assists. Hodge was the best girls' volleyball player in North Carolina history.

She was a four-time Pac-6 all-conference selection and was the Pac-6 Player of the Year two times, including a unanimous selection in 2006. She participated on the USA Youth and Junior National Teams, where she was voted the Most Valuable Player and "Best Attacker" at the 2004 NORCECA Championships in Cataño, Puerto Rico.

Hodge played club volleyball for North Carolina's "Triangle 18's" where she was selected as the Most Valuable Player of the North Carolina Regional Championships for the 18's Gold age division and became the first ever player from the Carolina region to be named to the all-Tournament team at the USA Junior Olympic Girls' Volleyball Championships.

After being named the North Carolina Volleyball Gatorade Player of the Year as a junior and senior, she was named the 2006 Gatorade National Player of the Year for volleyball. Hodge was considered the top high school recruit for the class of 2006 and got over 150 scholarship offers from various universities, such as volleyball powerhouses Stanford, USC, Washington, and Long Beach State. She, along with two other top 10 high school recruits, led Penn State to the consensus number 1 recruiting class ranking for the Class of 2006.

Penn State
Hodge is a 6'3" (1.91 m) outside hitter, and she can jump and touch .

Penn State career highlights include scoring the championship winning kill in the 2007 NCAA championship over Stanford, and the championship kill in the 2009 championship against Texas and being named the Big Ten Player of the Year as a freshman, the first freshman to accomplish the feat.

Hodge is a four-time First Team All-American and was named the NCAA national championship Most Outstanding Player in 2007 and 2008.

2006 (Freshman)
In her first season, she led the Big Ten and the team in points per game (5.57) and kills per game (4.83), and was also second on the team in service aces (39) and digs (303). Her 551 kills ranks sixth on the Penn State single-season record chart and is the highest for the rally-scoring era, and she also became only the seventh Nittany Lion Player to tally over 500 kills in a single season. She posted a career high 27 kills in the comeback win over Texas on September 8. She tied the school record for kills in a three-game match with 25 in the sweep of Northwestern. She had a career high 20 digs against Michigan and also had 11 double-double matches on the year.

She made Big Ten history by becoming the first freshman to be named Player of the Year in the then-23 year history of the award. She also became the first ever Big Ten volleyball player to win the Gatorade National Player of the Year and AVCA National Freshman of the Year in consecutive seasons. She became just the third true freshman in seven years to be named a First Team All-American.

2007 (Sophomore)
Hodge recorded 4.60 kills per game and had 561 kills on the year. She was the only player to play in all 122 games of the season. Hodge was also tied for second on the team for service aces (35), and also had 310 digs, good for second on the team. Hodge also had a 96% service reception clip, as she recorded only 33 service reception errors in 833 attempts. She finished the season leading the team in total points, as she was responsible for 644.5 total points and 5.28 points per game. She helped Penn State to a 20–0 Big Ten record and their record fifth consecutive conference title.

In the 2007 NCAA Tournament, she led Penn State to their first NCAA final four appearance since their last NCAA title in 1999. She saved one of her best performances for their 3–2 win over top-seeded Stanford in the national championship, as she recorded a season-high 26 kills and had a key serving string in the decisive fifth game win, serving 6 straight points. Her performance in this match led her to be named the NCAA championship Most Outstanding Player, joining former Penn State players Terri Zemaitis (1997) and Lauren Cacciamani (1998 & 1999) to be named the Championship MOP. In addition, Hodge was also named a First Team All-American for the second consecutive year and was a Honda Sports Award nominee for the top volleyball player in the country.

2008 (Junior)
As a junior, Hodge led a team consisting of six All-Americans with 470 total kills on the year on a .349 hitting percentage. She led the team in kills 21 times and ended 2008 fifth all-time on Penn State's career kill list with 1,582. Hodge was also named an ESPN The Magazine First Team All-American.

In Big Ten play, Hodge had 246 total kills and averaged 4.10 kills per set, en route to being named a unanimous First Team All-Big Ten selection for the third consecutive year. Penn State went 20–0 in the Big Ten and didn't lose a single set.

In the 2008 NCAA Tournament, Hodge was named the NCAA University Park Regional Most Outstanding Player after having a combined 28 kills with just 4 errors against regional opponents Western Michigan and California. In the NCAA National Semifinals in Omaha, Hodge had a season high 23 kills against Nebraska in the five set win. The following night, Hodge was named an AVCA First Team All-American for the third consecutive year.

In the National Title match against Stanford, Hodge had a match high 16 kills with just 2 errors and added 14 digs and 2 blocks to lead the Lions to their second consecutive NCAA championship, capping off an undefeated year. She was named the NCAA Championship Most Outstanding Player for the second consecutive year, becoming only the third player in NCAA Tournament history to earn the award two times.

2009 (Senior)
Her senior year, Hodge's 560 kills helped to once again lead the Penn State Nittany Lions to an NCAA championship. She was named a First Team All-American for the fourth time in a row.

Hodge was also named Big Ten Player of the Year for the second time.

In the National Title match against Texas, the Nittany Lions went down two sets to none but under Hodge's leadership Penn State was able to come back and win it. Hodge tallied 21 kills in the five-set match, one of which came on the final point of the match.

In 2010, she also won the Honda Sports Award as the nation's top female collegiate volleyball player, and went on to be one of the co-winners of the Honda-Broderick Cup, awarded to the nation's top female collegiate athlete.

Career outside US
In November 2010 she joined Carnaghi Villa Cortese a volleyball team that plays in Italian Serie A1.

Hodge played at the 2013 Club World Championship with Guangdong Evergrande winning the bronze medal after defeating 3–1 to Voléro Zürich.

2012- 2013
Hodge competed for Team USA in the 2012 Grand Prix winning the gold medal and the Most Valuable Player and Best Scorer awards. She later won the silver medal at the 2012 Summer Olympics.

In the Pan-American Cup, Hodge won the Best Spiker award and the gold medal.

College career statistics

Awards

College

Four-time First Team AVCA All-American (2006–09)
Four-time unanimous First Team All-Big Ten (2006–09)
Four-time First Team AVCA All-Mideast Region (2006–09)
2010 Honda-Broderick Cup
2010 Honda Sports Award winner in Volleyball
2009 Honda Sports Award nominee
2009 NCAA Final Four All-Tournament Team
2009 Big Ten Player of the Year
2009 Academic All-American of the Year
2009 Gainesville Regional Most Outstanding Player
2008 NCAA Championship Most Outstanding Player
2008 NCAA Final Four All-Tournament Team
2008 NCAA University Park Regional Most Outstanding Player
2008 Volleyball Magazine First Team All-American
2008 Big Ten Player of the Week (12/1)
2008 CoSIDA Second Team Academic All-American
2008 Academic All-Big Ten
2008 Chicago Classic All-Tournament Team
2008 Hawaiian Airlines Classic All-Tournament Team
2008 Unanimous Preseason All-Big Ten
2007 Volleyball Magazine First Team All-American
2007 NCAA Championship Most Outstanding Player
2007 NCAA Final Four All-Tournament Team
2007 Honda Sports Award nominee
2007 Penn State Golden Volleyball for reaching 1,000 kills
2007 Penn State Female Student Athlete of the Week (9/10, 12/19)
2007 Academic All-Big Ten
2007 AVCA National Player of the Week (9/10)
2007 Big Ten Player of the Week (9/10)
2007 Penn State Classic Most Valuable Player
2007 Yale Classic All-Tournament Team
2007 Unanimous Preseason All-Big Ten
2006 AVCA National Freshman of the Year
2006 AVCA Mideast Region Freshman of the Year
2006 Volleyball Magazine First Team All-American
2006 Volleyball Magazine National Freshman of the Year
2006 Big Ten Player of the Year
2006 Big Ten Freshman of the Year
2006 Big Ten All-Freshman Team
2006 NCAA Seattle Regional All-Tournament Team
2006 LSU Classic All-Tournament Team
2006 Penn State Invitational All-Tournament Team
2006 Texas Invitational All-Tournament Team
2006 Big Ten Player of the Week (9/25, 10/23, 11/27)

High school
Four-time Pac-6 All-Conference (2003–06)
Three-time USA Volleyball Carolina Region Most Valuable Player (2004–06)
Two-time North Carolina Gatorade Volleyball Player of the Year (2005–06)
Two-time Pac-6 Player of the Year (2005–06)
Two-time Prepvolleyball.com All-American
2006 Prepvolleyball.com #1 "Senior Ace" (top recruit)
2006 Gatorade National Player of the Year
2006 Volleyball Magazine National High School Player of the Year
2006 National High School Coaches Association National High School Senior Athlete of the Year
2006 News and Observer North Carolina High School Female Athlete of the Year
2006 Mizuno Volleyball All-American
2006 Volleyball Magazine "Fab 50"
2006 AAU All-American
2006 North Carolina Regional Championship Most Valuable Player
2006 USA Junior Girls' Olympic Volleyball Championships All-Tournament Team
2006 Paul Williamson Award
2006 Pac-6 Athlete of the Year
2004 NORCECA Championships Most Valuable Player
2004 NORCECA Championships "Best Attacker"
2004 Prepvolleyball.com National Junior of the Year finalist
2003 Prepvolleyball.com National Sophomore of the Year finalist

National Team 
 2012 FIVB World Grand Prix  MVP, Best scorer
 2013 Pan-American Cup "Best Spiker"

See also
Penn State Nittany Lions women's volleyball
List of Pennsylvania State University Olympians

References

External links
 
 
 
 
 
 

American women's volleyball players
1988 births
Sportspeople from Durham, North Carolina
People from Saint Thomas, U.S. Virgin Islands
Living people
Penn State Nittany Lions women's volleyball players
Volleyball players at the 2012 Summer Olympics
Olympic silver medalists for the United States in volleyball
Medalists at the 2012 Summer Olympics
Outside hitters
African-American volleyball players
Expatriate volleyball players in Italy
Expatriate volleyball players in Poland
Expatriate volleyball players in Azerbaijan
Expatriate volleyball players in China
American expatriate sportspeople in Italy
American expatriate sportspeople in Poland
American expatriate sportspeople in Azerbaijan
American expatriate sportspeople in China
Big Ten Athlete of the Year winners
21st-century African-American sportspeople
21st-century African-American women
20th-century African-American people
20th-century African-American women
Serie A1 (women's volleyball) players